ACC Tournament may refer to:

 ACC men's basketball tournament, founded 1954
 ACC women's basketball tournament, founded 1978
 ACC men's soccer tournament, founded 1987
 ACC women's soccer tournament, founded 1988
 Atlantic Coast Conference baseball tournament, founded 1973
 Atlantic Coast Conference softball tournament, founded 1992